The Original Wicked Lester Sessions is a bootleg release of Wicked Lester's 1972 album for Epic Records. The album was recorded over a period of months when time was available at Jimi Hendrix's newly built Electric Lady Studios. A master tape cover shows the date 10.15.72. The recordings were slowed when Epic demanded the group fire guitarist Steve Coronel and replace him with Ron Leejack. When the album was completed and presented to Epic, its A&R director Don Ellis hated it and refused to release it. Reeling from the rejection and dissatisfied with the sound of the album itself, Wicked Lester members Paul Stanley and Gene Simmons left the group and formed a new incarnation of Wicked Lester, soon recruiting drummer Peter Criss and guitarist Ace Frehley and changing the newer group's name to Kiss.

In 1977, fearing Epic would release the album (which included then-rare pictures of Simmons and Stanley without makeup) to capitalize on Kiss' subsequent fame, Kiss and its label Casablanca purchased all rights to the album for $138,000, then shelved it permanently. Bootleg versions of the album appear on P2P networks.  Tracks 1, 3 and 5 were released on the  Kiss box set in 2001.

Track listing 
"Love Her All I Can" (2:28) Stanley
"Sweet Ophelia"  (2:56) Barry Mann/Gerry Goffin
"Keep Me Waiting"  (3:04) Stanley
"Simple Type"  (2:33) Simmons
"She" (2:54) Coronel/Simmons
"Too Many Mondays"  (3:27) Barry Mann/Cynthia Weil
"What Happens in the Darkness"  (2:59) Tami Lester Smith
"When the Bell Rings"  (3:11) Austin Roberts (singer)/Christopher Welch
"Molly" (aka Some Other Guy) (2:23) Stanley
"We Want to Shout It Out Loud" (2:04) The Hollies
"Long, Long Road" (4:28) Stanley

Note: As the album was never officially released, there are many different song orderings available on downloaded copies, with "Love Her All I Can," "What Happens in the Darkness," "Simple Type," and "Sweet Ophelia" all serving as the opening tracks for various versions.

Personnel 
Paul Stanley (Stanley Eisen) – lead vocals, guitar
Gene Simmons (Gene Klein) – lead vocals, bass
Ron Leejack – lead guitar, banjo
Brooke Ostrander – piano, horns
Tony Zarrella – drums, percussion

Additional personnel
Steve Coronel – guitar

References

Sources 
kiss-related-recordings.nl
kissfaq.com

Kiss (band)
Albums produced by Eddie Kramer
Epic Records albums
Unreleased albums
Bootleg recordings